is a 2009 Japanese anime television series. It is a sequel to the anime series Kiddy Grade, created by gímik and Satelight and directed by Keiji Gotoh. The manga adaptation , illustrated by Yukari Higa, ran in Comp Ace and was released into two collected volumes.

Plot

Twenty-five years after Éclair and Lumière, (from the flagship Kiddy Grade series), rescued the galaxy from destruction's doorstep, the GTO (Galactic Trade Organization), created after the defeat of the GOTT (Galactic Organization of Trade and Tariffs), act on behalf of universal peace by combating criminal activity. Their special ES division mirrored after the GOTT's ES (Encounter of Shadow-work) force, now includes publicly acknowledged ES member candidates. The series follows three such trainees, Ascoeur, Q-feuille, and Di-air as they work their way to ES membership.

Broadcast

A DVD containing a 7-minute preview of the new series was released on 2007-05-25 but nothing further was heard until, on February 26, 2009 it was re-announced under the new title  along with news of a new manga adaptation, .

The anime aired from autumn of 2009 until spring of 2010, and was produced by studio Satelight, based on a story by gímik. The manga version, with story by Hidefumi Kimura and art by Yukari Higa (Shina Dark), is being serialized in the magazine Comp Ace, starting March 26, 2009.

Funimation announced during their Otakon 2017 panel that they have licensed the anime for a North American release.

References

External links
  
 

2009 anime television series debuts
2009 manga
2010 Japanese novels
Adventure anime and manga
Comedy anime and manga
Funimation
Hidefumi Kimura
2000s Japanese LGBT-related television series
Kiddy Grade
LGBT in anime and manga
Light novels
Satelight
Seinen manga
Science fiction anime and manga
Sunrise (company)
Yuri (genre) anime and manga
Yuri (genre) light novels
2010s Japanese LGBT-related television series